Epithelioid sarcoma is a rare soft tissue sarcoma arising from mesenchymal tissue and characterized by epithelioid-like features. It accounts for less than 1% of all soft tissue sarcomas. It was first clearly characterized by F.M. Enzinger in 1970. It commonly presents itself in the distal limbs (fingers, hands, forearms, or feet) of young adults as a small, soft mass or a series of bumps. A proximal version has also been described, frequently occurring in the upper extremities. Rare cases have been reported in the pelvis, vulva, penis, and spine.

Histologically, epithelioid sarcoma forms nodules with central necrosis surrounded by bland, polygonal cells with eosinophilic cytoplasm and peripheral spindling. Epithelioid sarcomas typically express vimentin, cytokeratins, epithelial membrane antigen, and CD34, whereas they are usually negative for S100, desmin, and FLI1 (FLI-1). They typically stain positive for CA125.

Epithelioid sarcoma most commonly strikes young adults, yet no age group is immune. The disease has a tendency to develop local recurrences and metastasis thereafter to regional lymph nodes, lung, bone, brain, and other locations, including the scalp. Generally speaking, epithelioid sarcoma has a high rate of relapse after initial treatment and tends to recur locally (at or near the original tumor site). Epithelioid sarcoma also demonstrates lymphatic spread (in 22-48% of cases), and metastasis (in 21-63% of cases). These events, as well as advanced stage (progression) and grade (aggressiveness), are predictive of an overall worse outcome. The overall five-year survival rate for epithelioid sarcoma is anywhere from 25 to 78%. Importantly, the 10-year and 15-year survival rate drops off significantly. Associated with a more positive outcome are younger age, female vs. male sex, distal vs. proximal location, smaller tumor size, and negative margins upon tumor resection.

Signs and symptoms
Epithelioid sarcoma is a slow-growing and relatively painless tumor, often resulting in a lengthy period of time between presentation and diagnosis. Due to its ambiguity, it is often misdiagnosed, mistaken as a persistent wart or cyst. It most commonly presents itself in the distal limbs (fingers, hands, forearms, or feet) as a small, soft mass or a series of bumps. It is most often described as a firm-to-hard palpable mass, either in the deep soft tissue or in the dermis. Often, ulcerate causing a mistaken diagnosis of a poorly healing traumatic wound or wart. About 13% of patients will present with multifocal tumors, and about 13% of patients will present with metastatic disease.

Genetics
The most common genetic mutation (found in 80-90% of epithelioid sarcomas) is the inactivation of the SMARCB1 gene, or the loss of INI-1 function, which is thought to be a major contributor to disease progression. Epithelioid sarcoma typically contains chromosome 22q11.2 mutations or deletions and 8q gains, particularly i(8) (>q10). Aberrations of 18q and 8q, as well as recurrent gains at 11q13, have also been observed.
  
The SMARCB1 gene (also termed BAF47, INI1, or hSNF5) is located on chromosome 22q11.2 and codes for a member of the SWI/SNF chromatin remodeling complex. Loss of SMARCB1 function is the most common genetic mutation observed in epithelioid sarcoma, and this dysfunction is likely a major driver of disease progression. SMARCB1 is a core protein subunit of the 15 subunit SWI/SNF (or BAF) complex involved in regulating the nucleosome architecture of our genome and has been shown to be a potent tumor suppressor gene, meaning that its primary role is to control cell division and to even halt division under appropriate circumstances (i.e. signals to over-replicate). As this tumor suppressor is commonly inactivated in epithelioid sarcoma, cell division can fail to appropriately halt, resulting in unregulated cellular growth and the formation of cancer tumors. Several research teams are currently developing techniques to reverse this loss of genetic function characteristic of epithelioid sarcoma.

Molecular biology

VEGF
VEGF (vascular endothelial growth factor) is often over-expressed in epithelioid sarcoma. This is a critical pathway in angiogenesis, a process that cancer cells use to form new blood vessels, which provide necessary elements to the tumor for tumor survival. Anti-VEGF agents such as pazopanib have shown promise across several different carcinomas and in soft tissue sarcomas. In one case study, a patient with advanced metastatic vulvar epithelioid sarcoma showed a partial resolution of both lung and pleural metastases when pazopanib was administered, whereas all other therapies had failed

MET
MET (mesenchymal to epithelial transition) is another biological pathway that is likely involved in the development and progression of epithelioid sarcoma. c-MET is a tyrosine kinase oncogene, and its signaling pathway has been implicated in a variety of malignancies, including many cancers.

Sonic hedgehog and Notch
The Sonic hedgehog and Notch signaling pathways are also suspected to be up-regulated in epithelioid sarcoma. These cell signaling pathways control cellular proliferation and differentiation. They are also involved in cancer stem cell coordination and disease invasiveness and metastasis. Hhat inhibitors (such as RU-SKI 43) block the Sonic hedgehog signaling pathway by inhibiting hedgehog palmitoyl acytl-transferase. Current trials are investigating Notch inhibitors against epithelioid sarcoma.

mTOR
The frequent hyperactivation of mTOR (mammalian target of rapamycin) signaling has also been observed in epithelioid sarcoma. The mTOR pathway has been described as a “master switch” for cellular catabolism and anabolism, and it can enhance cell cycle progression, cell survival, and block normal cell death (apoptosis). It has been demonstrated that simply blocking mTOR signaling can result in the reactivation of the AKT pathway, negating much of the anti-mTOR's efficacy. This reactivation of AKT has been shown to be c-MET-dependent, resulting in the rationale that blocking both mTOR and c-MET concurrently would show increased efficacy.

EGFR
The over-expression of epidermal growth factor receptor (EGFR) has been reported in a majority of epithelioid sarcomas. EGFR is a member of the HER receptor family. Upon ligand binding, EGFR phosphorylation triggers the activation of downstream signaling pathways involved in critical cellular functions such as proliferation, survival, and angiogenesis. In-vitro and in-vivo laboratory experiments have demonstrated that the blockade of EGFR in epithelioid sarcoma results in decreased cell proliferation, increased apoptosis, and abrogated invasion and migration capacities. While the simple blockade of EGFR with a single agent has shown limited results in the clinical setting, when used as part of a combination regime (where an EGFR inhibitor is combined with an mTOR inhibitor), a synergism has been observed, and superior tumor growth inhibition has been demonstrated.

CD109
CD109 is often expressed in advanced epithelioid sarcoma and is thought to mark the cancer stem cell (or cancer initiating cell) of the disease. Its level of expression has also been shown to be predictive of outcome. Cancer stem cells are a small population of tumor cells characterized by general chemo-resistance, the ability to self-renew, multi-differentiation potential, dormancy capabilities, and tumorigenesis. Therefore, cancer stem cells are thought to play key roles in the progression and relapse of cancer.

Cyclin D1
Cyclin D1 is a protein requisite for cell cycle progression and has been shown to be up-regulated in epithelioid sarcoma. Cyclin D-1 is a regulator of cyclin-dependent kinases (CDK4 and CDK6). It has been shown to interact with the retinoblastoma protein (a tumor suppressor gene), CDK4 and CDK6, thyroid hormone receptor beta, and nuclear receptor coactivator 1, among others. Cyclin D and CDKs promote cell cycle progression by releasing transcription factors that are important for the initiation of DNA replication. Abnormal levels of cyclin D-1 may promote rapid cell division in epithelioid sarcoma.

Diagnosis
Tissue biopsy is the diagnostic modality of choice. Due to a high incidence of lymph node involvement, a sentinel lymph node biopsy is often performed. A common characteristic of epithelioid sarcoma (observed in 80% of all cases) is the loss of function of the SMARCB1 gene (also termed BAF47, INI1, or hSNF5). Immunohistochemical staining of INI1 is available and can be used for the diagnosis of epithelioid sarcoma. MRI is the diagnostic modality of choice for imaging prior to biopsy and pathologic diagnosis, with the primary role being the determination of anatomic boundaries.

Staging
The staging for epithelioid sarcoma takes into account size and location of the primary tumor, lymph node involvement, presence and location of metastasis, and histologic grade (a measure of disease aggressiveness)

Treatment
Surgical resection of the tumor with wide margins remains the preferred method of treatment, and has shown the most success against the disease. Recently, limb-sparing surgery has been explored with moderate success.

In cases of advanced, recurrent, or metastasized disease, or if the tumor is inoperable, chemotherapy and radiation are the standard of care, although the overall success rates with these remains low.

In January 2020, The U.S. Food and Drug Administration approved Tazverik (tazemetostat), a compound that blocks the EZH2 methyltransferase for the treatment epithelioid sarcoma in patients aged 16 years and older with either metastatic or locally advanced (unable to be completely removed surgically) disease.
The effectiveness of tazemetostat is further reinforced by real world report recently published by Dr Sameer Rastogi et al.

Prognosis
The 5-year survival rate for epithelioid sarcoma patients is 50-70%, and the 10-year survival rate is 42-55%. Children with epithelioid sarcoma tend to have slightly better outcomes than adults, with 5 year survival rates around 65%. Pediatric patients also tend to display less lymphatic spread and metastasis. In addition to stage and grade of the tumor, gender, site, age at diagnosis, tumor size and microscopic pathology have all been shown to affect prognosis. Advanced stage and grade are associated with worse outcomes. Females tend to have more favorable outcomes than males, proximal cases show worse outcomes than distal cases, and younger age is associated with more positive outcomes. Tumors more than 2 cm in diameter and tumors with necrosis and vascular invasion have been correlated with a worse outcome.

The gold standard for chemotherapy is a combination of doxorubicin and ifosfamide. However, recent studies have suggested that the addition of ifosfamide to doxorubicin does not necessarily lead to an increase in overall survival. Etoposide, vincristine, dactinomycin, and cyclophosphamide have also traditionally been given.  Newer chemotherapies, such as gemcitabine and pazopanib, are currently being tested in clinical trials.

Radiation therapy is also a treatment option when tumors are deemed inoperable or wide surgical margins are not achievable. Radiation therapy in combination with chemotherapy has so far resulted in only minimal improvements to response rates. Trials with brachytherapy (an internal radiation treatment that delivers a high dose of radiation directly to the tumor and is thought to have fewer long-term side effects) have produced some positive results.

Research
Epithelioid sarcoma (especially advanced stage, recurrent, or metastasized disease) has been shown to be resistant to traditional cancer therapies, necessitating further exploration of novel treatment methods and techniques. Because of the relatively poor response of epithelioid sarcoma to traditional cancer treatments (surgery, chemotherapy, and radiation), new treatment strategies are being looked to.

Chemotherapy
New chemotherapies are being explored in current clinical trials for epithelioid sarcoma, although, thus far, none has shown significant improvement over the efficacy of doxorubicin/ifosfamide. These new agents include gemcitabine, pazopanib, cixutumumab, temozolomide, dasatanib, bevacizumab, taxanes, and vinorelbine.

Aldoxorubicin is a new pro-drug of doxorubicin. Doxorubicin is the standard of care for advanced or metastic epithelioid sarcoma, but has dose-limiting toxicities, namely acute and chronic cardiac toxicity. Doxorubicin has achieved response rates in the 12-23% range for patients with soft tissue sarcomas. Aldoxorubicin is a new version of doxorubicin that is designed to safely deliver a higher dose of the drug directly to the tumor, resulting in increased efficacy and less toxicity. It works by entering the bloodstream, binding to the albumin in the blood, traveling throughout the body, and releasing a doxorubicin payload when it encounters the acidic microenvironment of a tumor. Several phase I and II studies are ongoing, and, thus far at least, little if any cardiac toxicity has been observed.  A maximum tolerated dose of aldoxorubicin has been established at 3.5 times the MTD of doxorubicin, and studies have indicated increased response rates for patients with soft tissue sarcomas. What is unknown at this time are the potential long-term side-effects of this increased dose of doxorubicin. Several studies have shown increased risk of the development of secondary cancers associated with exposure to high-dose anthracyclines (such as doxorubicin).

TH-302 is another novel prodrug in current development. It targets tumor hypoxia, a common event in tumorigenesis where the tumor microenvironment is depleted of oxygen and becomes hypoxic. Hypoxic niches in tumors tend to harbor slower-growing cancer cells, making many chemotherapies ineffective in these areas. TH-302 directly targets these deep hypoxic regions, and once within them, it releases a cytotoxic payload of bromo-isophosphoramide mustard directly to the cancer cells. Given that epithelioid sarcoma is a slow-growing tumor, it is reasonable to hypothesize that ES tumors would be highly hypoxic and show a favorable response to TH-302. Several studies have observed increased efficacy of TH-302 when the hypoxic tumor microenvironment has been exasperated. Several phase I, II, and III trials with TH-302 and TH-302 in combination with doxorubicin are ongoing, and promising results have thus far been observed. Two phase 3 trials failed in 2015.

Immunotherapies
Immunotherapy is the strategy of using the body's own immune system to fight cancer. It usually involves “training” or “tweaking” the immune system so that it can better recognize and reject cancer cells. Different immunotherapies can include manipulation of the body's T-cells, NK cells, or Dendritic cells so they are more effective against cancer cells. They can also include the administration of laboratory-produced antibodies specific to tumor antigens to create or boost an immune response.

Vaccine therapy is perhaps the immunotherapeutic strategy with the most ongoing exploration in sarcomas at the current time, although, thus far at least, little evidence has emerged indicating that active vaccination alone can lead to tumor regression. Multiple techniques and treatment strategies are currently being studied in an effort to improve the objective response rate of vaccine therapy. Vaccines can deliver various tumor-associated factors (tumor antigens) to the immune system, resulting in a natural antibody and T-cell response to the tumor.

Adoptive immunotherapy seeks to expand a population of the body's T-cells that will recognize a specific tumor antigen. T-cells can be harvested and then expanded and genetically manipulated to recognize certain tumor markers. In one case, a patient with advanced epithelioid sarcoma who had failed multiple therapies showed a strong response to expanded lymphocytes and natural killer cells.

Immune checkpoint inhibitors have recently shown promise against several cancers and may hold promise against sarcomas as well. Tumors often evolve during disease progression, and they can develop an expression of inhibitory proteins that deter recognition by the immune system and allow the tumor to escape immune surveillance. By targeting these inhibitory proteins, a pathway is opened for the immune system to recognize the tumor. Two of these inhibitory proteins that have been studied recently are CTLA-4 and PD1, and drugs targeting these proteins are in development and showing some promise.

Anti-angiogenic therapies
Several anti-angiogenic agents are being explored in epithelioid sarcoma, a cancer that likely relies on angiogenesis for survival and progression. These agents interfere with various pro-angiogenic factors, several of which are known to be over-expressed in epithelioid sarcoma (VEGF and EGFR for example). Tumors require a blood supply to provide them with oxygen and nutrients necessary for their survival. As tumors expand and grow, they send out various signals (such as HIF1) that encourage new blood vessel development to the tumor. Anti-angiogenic agents, such as bevacizumab, attempt to slow or block the growth of tumors by essentially cutting off their blood supply.

Targeted therapies
Given the multiple genetic abnormalities and disrupted biological pathways observed in epithelioid sarcoma, drugs targeting these unique tumor characteristics are being looked at for more effective treatments.

Tyrosine kinase inhibitors
Tyrosine kinase inhibitors (such as sunitinib, pazopanib, and dasatinib) have shown some effect against several cancer types, most notably Imatinib-mesylate in gastrointestinal stromal tumors (GISTs). Tyrosine kinase (a subclass of protein kinases) is an enzyme that transfers a phosphate group from an ATP molecule to a protein in a cell. It functions as an “on” or “off” switch for many cellular functions, including signaling within the cell, and cell division.

Tyrosine kinases can contain mutations that cause them to become constitutively active, or stuck in the “on” position, resulting in unregulated cell division (a hallmark of cancer). Tyrosine kinase Inhibitors block the action of these enzymes. Tyrosine kinase inhibitors have been shown to inhibit the VEGF, EGFR, and MET, pathways that are frequently over-expressed in epithelioid sarcoma. They also can be used against the c-KIT and JAK-STAT signaling pathways, which are involved in many cancers and may be involved in epithelioid sarcoma. Temsirolimus is a tyrosine kinase inhibitor that blocks the effects of the mTOR protein and inhibits the mTOR pathway. Because of crosstalk between cell signaling pathways, it has been shown that, while interfering with the mTOR pathway alone produces only limited results in halting tumorigenesis, inhibiting both the mTOR and the EGFR pathways concurrently shows an increased effect.

SINE
Selective inhibitors of nuclear export (SINE) compounds, such as selinexor and CBS9106, are being investigated in several sarcomas and have recently shown promising results across a broad spectrum of both hematological malignancies and solid tumors. These compounds work by blocking the export of tumor suppressor genes from the cell's nucleus to the cell's cytoplasm, where they are rendered nonfunctional. Exportin 1 (a.k.a. XPO1 or CRM1) is a nuclear export protein responsible for the export of over 200 proteins, including the vast majority of tumor suppressor proteins. For tumor suppressor genes to carry out their normal function (appropriately initiating apoptosis), they must be located in the nucleus of the cell. Many cancer cells have been shown to express high levels of exportin1, resulting in the increased export of tumor suppressor proteins out of the nucleus and therefore counteracting the natural apoptic processes that protect the body from cancer. SINE compounds prevent the transport of these tumor suppressor proteins out of the nucleus, allowing them to function normally and encourage apoptosis. Recently, researchers have observed a synergistic effect when using SINE compounds in combination with traditional chemotherapies (such as doxorubicin). It has been demonstrated that a loss of INI1 expression can result in the “unmasking” of a nuclear export signal, resulting in the transport of tumor suppressor proteins out of the nucleus of the cell, thus favoring tumorigenesis. It is therefore reasonable to suspect that a SINE inhibitor would show efficacy against epithelioid sarcoma, as the disease is characterized by a loss of INI1 function.

HDAC inhibitors
Histone deacetylase (HDAC) inhibitors, such as vorinostat, have shown some promise in epithelioid sarcoma. Researchers in Texas are investigating whether or not HDAC inhibitors can reverse the loss of INI1 function that is characteristic of epithelioid sarcoma. HDAC inhibitors work by blocking events involved in DNA replication and, therefore, in cell division. Blocking HDAC has been shown to encourage cancer cells to enter apoptosis. Several dietary phytochemicals have been shown to be effective HDAC inhibitors. These include sulphorphane, indole-3-carbinol, and phenethyl isothiocyanates, found in broccoli, kale, and watercress, and epigallocatecehin-3-gallate, found in green tea.

CDK inhibitors
Because of the association (see above) with cyclin D1 CDK inhibitors are being studied.

palbociclib is a CDK inhibitor (approved for some breast cancer).
Other experimental CDK inhibitors include abemaciclib and ribociclib.

Targeting the cancer stem cell
Cancer stem cells (or cancer-initiating cells) are thought to be a small population of cells within the tumor that are directly responsible for tumor formation. They are thought to be resistant to treatment and to have the ability to form all the cells needed for tumor development. They are suspected to be a major contributing factor in cancer progression and relapse after treatment. Certain “stem-like” cells have been found in epithelioid sarcoma that are marked by CD109 (cluster of differentiation 109), providing a potentially drug-able target on the cancer stem cell for the disease. Certain challenges to targeting CD109 do exist, however, as CD109 is expressed in other areas of the body and not only in tumor cells.

Oncolytic viral therapy
Oncolytic viral therapy is an emerging cancer therapy that attempts to infect cancer cells with a genetically engineered virus that can penetrate the DNA of the cell. The virus then 1.) does direct damage to the cancer cell, 2.) is spread throughout the cells of the tumor via cellular (DNA) multiplication (tumor cell division and replication), and 3.) provides a target for a direct immune response from the patient.

It has been noted that the therapeutic potential of oncolytic virotherapy is not a simple consequence of the cytopathic effect but strongly relies on the induction of an endogenous immune response against transformed cells. Superior anticancer effects have been observed when oncolytic viruses are engineered to express (or be co-administered with) immunostimulatory molecules such as GM-CSF.

Telomelysin (OBP-301) is an adenovirus that targets telomerase, an enzyme that is expressed in practically all cancer cells but not in normal cells. OBP-301 has been studied in epithelioid sarcoma and shown to promote apoptosis and cell death [.

CGTG-102
CGTG-102 (developed by Oncos Therapeutics) is an adenovirus currently in orphan drug status for soft tissue sarcomas. It is modified to selectively replicate in p16/Rb-defective cells, which include most human cancer cells. In addition, CGTG-102 codes for the granulocyte–macrophage colony-stimulating factor (GM-CSF), a potent immunostimulatory molecule.

While the CGTG-102 oncolytic adenovirus has shown efficacy as a single agent against several soft tissue sarcomas, it would also be appealing to use in combination with other regimes, as oncolytic viruses have demonstrated very little overlap in side effects with traditional therapies such as chemotherapy and radiation. CGTG-102 has recently been studied in combination with doxorubicin, and a synergistic effect was observed. At least part of doxorubicin's mechanism of action is as an inducer of immunogenic cell death, and it has been suggested that immune response contributes to its overall anti-tumor activity. Doxorubicin has been shown to increase adenoviral replication in soft tissue sarcoma cells as well, potentially contributing to the observed synergistic effect in the virus/doxorubicin combination.

Additional images

See also
Soft tissue sarcoma
Sarcoma
Malignant rhabdoid tumour
Atypical teratoid/rhabdoid tumour

References

Further reading

External links 

Sarcoma
Dermal and subcutaneous growths